The 1899 Dartmouth football team represented Dartmouth College as an independent during the 1899 college football season. This season was the least successful under head coach William Wurtenburg. Of the nine games played during the year, only two were won. The team finished with the worst win percentage (.286) since the 1883 squad went winless, albeit against one team. The season began with easy defeats of Phillips Exeter Academy and e. That luck quickly changed and the team dropped seven straight games. The following game was the low point of the season, a 21–0 loss to Harvard. It was the worst defeat by the Crimson in nearly a decade. The year concluded with lopsided defeats by Columbia and Brown.

Schedule

References

Dartmouth
Dartmouth Big Green football seasons
Dartmouth football